James Shelby Downard (March 13, 1913 – March 16, 1998) was an American conspiracy theorist whose works, most of which have been published in various anthologies from Feral House, examined perceived occult symbolism, twilight language, and synchronicity behind historical events in the 20th century. Shelby is known for his addition to Masonic conspiracy theories with his belief that the Freemasons were responsible for the assassination of President John F. Kennedy through a ritual known as "Killing of the King".

Biography 

Vankin and Whalen write of Downard:

Downard is known for his essay “King-Kill/33: Masonic Symbolism in the Assassination of John F. Kennedy," originally published by Adam Parfrey. In the first edition of the book, Apocalypse Culture, he speculates that the Freemasons were responsible for the assassination of President John F. Kennedy. The essay was removed from the second edition of the book and replaced by another essay by Downard, "The Call to Chaos." Apocalypse Culture II contains another Downard essay, "America, The Possessed Corpse." Jim Keith, editor of yet another Feral House publication, Secret and Suppressed: Banned Ideas and Hidden History, included "Sorcery, Sex, Assassination", the original article of which King Kill/33 is an abridgment.

Included in Cult Rapture is "Riding the Downardian Nightmare", a piece written by Parfrey concerning a visit to Downard in Memphis, Tennessee.

Downard was assisted in many of his earlier works by his good friend, William N. Grimstad. Grimstad is better known as Jim Brandon, author of the Fortean classics, Weird America: A Guide to Places of Mystery in the United States and The Rebirth of Pan: Hidden Faces of the American Earth Spirit. In the early 1970s, he was assisted in his writing and editing by John and Darlene Cox in Lake Havasu; then, later in the early 1980s, he resided with John and Karen Bissell in Estacada, Oregon where Karen typed his manuscripts and John assisted with research.

References

Sources 
Brandon, Jim. Dunlap, Ill. The Rebirth of Pan: Hidden Faces of the American Earth Spirit, Firebird Press, 1983.
Downard, James Shelby, The Carnivals of Life and Death, Feral House, September 2006.
"Sorcery, Sex, Assassination", in Keith, Jim ed. Secret and Suppressed. Portland, Or.: Feral House, 1993.
"America, The Possessed Corpse", in Parfrey, Adam ed. Apocalypse Culture II. Venice, Calif.: Feral House, 2000.
"Riding the Downardian Nightmare", in Parfrey, Adam. Cult Rapture. Portland, Or.: Feral House, 1994.

1913 births
1998 deaths
American conspiracy theorists
Anti-Masonry